Fernando Maciel Gonçalves (born 16 August 1980), commonly known as Fernandão, is a Spanish-Brazilian  futsal player who plays for Dinamo as a Pivot.

Honours

2 Winner UEFA Futsal Cup (2012, 2014)
1 Runner World Cup (2008)
1 Campeonato Carioca (2001)
1 Campeonato Paulista
3 Campeonatos LNFS (España) (2011, 2012, 2013)
3 Copas de España (2011, 2012, 2013)
4 Copas del Rey (2011, 2012, 2013, 2014)
1 Supercopa de España (2013)
6 Catalonia Cup (2004, 2005, 2008, 2009, 2010, 2013)
1 Top scorer LNFS 05/06
1 Best Pívot of the LNFS (05/06)

External links
Official Website
LNFS profile
RFEF profile

1980 births
Living people
Spanish men's futsal players
Brazilian men's futsal players
FC Barcelona Futsal players
FS Martorell players
Brazilian emigrants to Spain